Telegraph is any apparatus or process to convey messages over long distances with no intermediary messenger.

Telegraph may also refer to:

Related to telegraphy
 Electrical telegraph, sends and receives messages via electric signals
 Printing telegraph, electrical telegraph that uses plain text instead of code
 Optical telegraph, sending visual signals with pivoting shutters in towers
 Hydraulic telegraph, based on the displacement of water in pipes, or on container water levels
 Engine order telegraph, device on a ship used by the pilot to signal engine speeds

Arts and entertainment
 Telegraphing (entertainment), giving a clear hint of the meaning or outcome of a dramatic action through acting

Music
 Telegraph (album), a 2005 album by Drake Bell (includes the title song)
 Telegraphs (band), an English alternative-rock band
 "Telegraph" (song), a 1983 single by Orchestral Manoeuvres in the Dark
 Telegraph Melts, a 1986 album by Jandek

Periodicals
 The Telegraph (disambiguation), a list of newspapers called The Telegraph, Daily Telegraph or Sunday Telegraph
 Evening Telegraph, a list of newspapers with that title
 Morning Telegraph, a list of newspapers with that title

Places
 Telegraph, Isles of Scilly, a settlement on the island of St Mary's, England
 Telegraph, Texas, a ghost town in Kimble County, Texas, United States
 Telegraph Avenue, in Alameda County, California, United States
 Telegraph City, an unincorporated community in Calaveras County, California, United States
 Telegraph Cove, a community on Vancouver Island, British Columbia, Canada
 Telegraph Creek, a community in  British Columbia, Canada
 Telegraph Peak (California), in the San Gabriel Mountains, San Bernardino County, California, United States
 Telegraph Peak (Lander County, Nevada)
 Telegraph Range, group of hills on the Nechako Plateau, British Columbia Interior, Canada
 Telegraph Plateau, a region of the North Atlantic
 Telegraph Column (Damascus), Syria, is a commemorative monument
 Telegraph Canyon Formation, a geologic formation in Nevada
 Telegraph House, a historic hotel located in Baddeck, Nova Scotia
 Telegraph House (Taganrog), a building in Taganrog, Rostov region
 Telegraph Island, in the Elphinstone Inlet
 Telegraph Hill (disambiguation), various places
 Telegraph Road (disambiguation), various roads
 Telegraph Building (disambiguation), various buildings
 Telegraph Peak (disambiguation), various peaks

Other uses
 Telegraph (sports), to unintentionally alert an opponent to one's immediate situation
 Telegraph (1914 sternwheeler), a steamboat in Oregon, United States
 Telegraph (sternwheeler 1903), a steamboat in Oregon and Washington, United States
 Telegraph Media Group, publisher of UK newspapers, previously Telegraph Group
 Telegraph plant, a tropical Asian shrub
 HMS Telegraph

See also
 Telegram (disambiguation)
 Telegraph code, a character encodings used to transmit information through telegraphy machines
 Telegraph Avenue (novel), a 2012 book by Michael Chabon
 El Telégrafo (disambiguation)